Samson Chukwu (also spelled Samsson) (died May 1, 2001) was a 27-year-old Nigerian asylum seeker detained in the Swiss canton of Valais in an attempt to deport him to Lagos, Nigeria via Kloten, Switzerland. While detained in Granges, Valais at Crêtelongue Prison, he was handcuffed lying on his stomach. A police officer rested his weight onto Chukwu's back leading to Chukwu's death by "postural asphyxiation".

Before authorities were able to complete an autopsy, State Councilor Jean-René Fournier, responsible for security and institutions claimed that the cause of death was a heart attack. The final autopsy results released in July 2001 confirmed asphyxiation as the cause of death.

Chukwu's family filed a lawsuit against local police officials. However, a Valais court later dismissed the lawsuit citing officer ignorance of the detainment method's danger.

Amnesty International used the case to urge Switzerland to reduce their program of forced deportations. The organization has also used Chukwu's death as evidence of a larger pattern of excessive force used by Swiss police, and the event lead to police reform in the country. Chukwu's death was the second case in two years of an asylum seeker being suffocated to death by Swiss authorities.

While large scale public protests did not occur at the time, Chukwu's name has often been cited in subsequent Black Lives Matter protests in Switzerland.

References 

2001 deaths
1974 births
People who died in police custody